The Rietvlei River is a small river in central Gauteng Province, South Africa. It feeds the wetlands of the Rietvlei Nature Reserve, before it flows into Rietvlei Dam, which is one of the main sources of water for Pretoria. The river downstream of the dam is known as Sesmylspruit, which is a tributary of the Hennops River and part of the Crocodile River (Limpopo) basin.

References

External links
Ecological State of the Major Rivers and Streams within the Northern Service Delivery Region of the Ekurhuleni Metropolitan Municipality
The Chemical Composition of the Upper Hennops River and its implications on the Water Quality of the Rietvlei Dam

Crocodile River (Limpopo)
Rivers of Gauteng